Basketball South Africa (BSA) is the governing body for men's and women's basketball in South Africa, and is responsible for the administration of the South African national basketball teams (both men's and women's), BSA has been an affiliate of FIBA Africa since 1992 and its offices are located in Johannesburg.  The president is Sanele Mthiyane.

BSA was admitted to FIBA in 1992, and its senior team has since competed at the AfroBasket but has yet to qualify for the FIBA World Cup. The Basketball National League administers the elite men's professional game. BSA is registered with SASCOC as the officially recognised basketball federation.

The President of Basketball South Africa is Mr. Sanele Mthiyane.

History
The Basketball Federation of South Africa (BFSA) was founded in 1953. During the time, women were encouraged to play in the similar but different sport of netball. BFSA was expelled from international tournaments in 1980 by the world governing body International Amateur Basketball Federation (FIBA) in opposition towards the racial policies of the government of South Africa, the voting was 49 in favour with 2 against, and 10 abstentions. BFSA had earlier been under suspension since 1977. In 1992, all the racially divided basketball organisations namely – Basketball Federation of South Africa (BFSA) for whites, Midlands Basketball Union (MBU) for coloureds and indians, with the South African Basketball Association (SABA) for blacks were united under the auspices of an interim body called Basketball Union of South Africa (BUSA) that had four members from each organisation, which led to the establishment of Basketball South Africa, and ultimately being readmitted to FIBA.

In 2015, the American NBA held an exhibition game in Johannesburg known as the NBA Africa Game in an attempt to popularise the game further. Tickets were quickly sold out although local games receive less attendances. The game involved an all-star Team Africa vs Team World. The NBA held another instalment of the all-star game in 2017.

National teams

Men
South Africa national basketball team
South Africa national under-19 basketball team
South Africa national under-17 basketball team

Women
South Africa women's national basketball team
South Africa women's national under-19 basketball team
South Africa women's national under-17 basketball team

Players

Logo

See also

 Sport in South Africa
 Basketball National League
 Basketball in Africa
 FIBA Africa

References

External links
Official website
FIBA profile

National members of FIBA Africa
Sports governing bodies in South Africa
Organisations based in Johannesburg
Basketball in South Africa
Sports organizations established in 1992
1992 establishments in South Africa